Mexico competed at the UCI Track Cycling World Championships on various occasions.

2015

The 2015 UCI Track Cycling World Championships were held in Saint-Quentin-en-Yvelines at the Vélodrome de Saint-Quentin-en-Yvelines from 18 to 22 February 2015. A team of 4 cyclists (4 women, 0 men) was announced to represent Mexico in the event.

Results

Women

Sources

2016
Mexico participated in the 2016 event at Lee Valley VeloPark in London, United Kingdom from 2–4 March 2016. A team of 6 cyclists (4 women, 2 men) was announced to represent the country in the event.

Results

Men

Sources

Women

Sources

References

Nations at the UCI Track Cycling World Championships
Mexico at cycling events